Ware is a hamlet in the East Devon district of Devon, England.

Hamlets in Devon